5-Fluoro-N,N-dimethyltryptamine (5-fluoro-DMT, 5F-DMT) is a tryptamine derivative related to compounds such as 5-bromo-DMT and 5-MeO-DMT. Fluorination of psychedelic tryptamines either reduces or has little effect on 5-HT2A/C receptor affinity or intrinsic activity, although 6-fluoro-DET is inactive as a psychedelic despite acting as a 5-HT2A agonist (cf. lisuride), while 4-fluoro-5-methoxy-DMT is a much stronger agonist at 5-HT1A than 5-HT2A.

See also 
 5-Fluoro-AMT
 5-Fluoro-DET
 5-Fluoro-MET
 6-fluoro-AMT
 6-Fluoro-DMT
 4-fluoro-5-methoxy-DMT
 6-Fluoro-DET(6-Fluoro-DET)
 O-4310
It's worth noting that GR-159897 is based on the same structure.

References 

Psychedelic tryptamines
Tryptamines
Fluoroarenes
Dimethylamino compounds